Pool Geovanny Gavilánez Solís (born 3 August 1981) is an Ecuadorian football manager and former player who played as a midfielder. He is the current manager of Guayaquil City.

Playing career
Born in Guayaquil, Gavilánez spent the most of his career linked to Emelec. However, he never made his first team debut with the side, serving loan deals at Santa Rita, Delfín, Peñarol Portoviejo and Audaz Octubrino before leaving in 2005.

Gavilánez subsequently represented Deportivo Quevedo, Toreros, Patria, Calvi and Carlos Borbor Reyes, retiring with the latter in the end of 2011, aged 32.

Managerial career
After retiring, Gavilánez started managing Guayaquil Sport. For the 2017 season, he became the sporting director of River Ecuador before being named manager of the club (now named Guayaquil City) in September.

On 6 November 2017, Gavilánez renewed his contract with Guayaquil City for the 2018 campaign.

References

External links
 
 

1981 births
Living people
Sportspeople from Guayaquil
Ecuadorian footballers
Association football midfielders
C.S. Emelec footballers
Delfín S.C. footballers
C.D. Quevedo footballers
Ecuador under-20 international footballers
Ecuadorian football managers
Guayaquil City F.C. managers